Hamed Shiri; is an Iranian Football defender, who plays for Iranian football club Nassaji in the Persian Gulf Pro League.

Club career

Early years
He started his career with Arash Amol, at youth levels. He joined Shamoushak U21 in 2004 and was promoted to the first team in summer 2005 by Bahman Foroutan. In summer 2006, he was loaned to Fajr Sepasi, to spend his conscription period. Later he moved to Nassaji and spent 2 successful seasons with them.

Saipa
Shiri joined Saipa in summer 2011. He made his debut for them against Sab Qom as a starter in August 2011. He usually plays in center back role, while he could also play as right back and defensive midfielder. In May 2013 he signed a two-year contract extension, which keeps him in the club until 2015.

Club career statistics

References

External links
 Hamed Shiri at PersianLeague.com
 Hamed Shiri at IranLeague.ir

Living people
People from Amol
Iranian footballers
Shamoushak Noshahr players
Fajr Sepasi players
Nassaji Mazandaran players
Saipa F.C. players
1986 births
Association football midfielders
Sportspeople from Mazandaran province